Kieran Treadwell (born 6 November 1995) is an English-born Irish rugby union player who plays in the second row for Ulster and Ireland.

Born in Sutton, south London, he attended The John Fisher School. His mother is Irish, and he represented Ireland at under-18 level. He joined the Harlequins academy ahead of the 2014–15 season, and made his senior debut for the club in 2014. He had a dual registration deal with London Scottish, for whom he played in the 2015–16 British and Irish Cup. He played for England at under-20 level, and was part of the team that won the 2015 Six Nations Under 20s Championship.

He moved to Ulster ahead of the 2016–17 season. He played regularly in his first season, thanks to the absence of Alan O'Connor and Peter Browne with injuries, and the departure of Dan Tuohy to Bristol Bears, making 21 starts and winning 47 lineouts. He was named by Joe Schmidt in the Ireland squad for their 2017 Summer Tour. In 2017–18 he made 23 appearances, including 19 starts, and made 155 tackles. In 2018–19 he established himself in the team alongside Iain Henderson, making 28 appearances including 22 starts, and 235 tackles. In 2019–20 he made 19 appearances, including 11 starts.

In 2020–21 he made 18 appearances, including 13 starts, and 149 tackles, and made his 100th appearance for the province in February 2021. Having not made an appearance for Ireland since 2017, he was called up for the 2022 Six Nations Championship, and scored his first international try for Ireland in a 57–6 win over Italy. He was called up to the Ireland squad for their 2022 tour of New Zealand.

International Tries 
As of 1 March 2022

References

External links
Ulster Rugby profile
United Rugby Championship profile

Ireland profile

1995 births
Living people
Harlequin F.C. players
London Scottish F.C. players
Ulster Rugby players
Irish rugby union players
Rugby union locks
Ireland international rugby union players
Irish Exiles rugby union players